Agoseris parviflora is a North American species of flowering plants in the family Asteraceae known by the common name Steppe agoseris or sagebrush agoseris or false dandelion. It is found in the Western United States primarily in the Great Basin and the region drained by the Colorado River but also in the eastern foothills of the Sierra Nevada and on the western edge of the Great Plains. Its range extends from eastern Oregon and eastern California to Wyoming, Colorado, and New Mexico, with a few isolated populations in western Kansas and western South Dakota.

Description
Agoseris parviflora resembles  the common dandelion (Taraxacum officinale) in having no leafy stems, only a rosette of leaves close to the ground. There is a single flower head with many yellow ray florets but no disc florets.

References

External links
Paul Slichter, False Agoseris, Sagebrush Agoseris  Agoseris parviflora 
Oregon Flora Image Project, Agoseris parviflora (Nutt.) D. Dietr. sagebrush agoseris - native 

parviflora
Flora of the Western United States
Flora of California
Flora of the Sierra Nevada (United States)
Taxa named by Thomas Nuttall
Plants described in 1899
Flora without expected TNC conservation status